Rapij (also Romanized as Rāpīj; also known as Epīch, Rāh Pīch, and Rāpīch) is a village in Gafr and Parmon Rural District, Gafr and Parmon District, Bashagard County, Hormozgan Province, Iran. At the 2006 census, its population was 106, in 23 families.

References 

Populated places in Bashagard County